Pratley is a surname. Notable people with the surname include:

Brooke Pratley (born 1980), Australian former rower
Darren Pratley (born 1985), English footballer
Nils Pratley (born 1967), British journalist
Philip Louis Pratley (1884–1958), English-born Canadian bridge designer
Susan Pratley (born 1984), Australian international netball player

See also
Prat (disambiguation)
Ratley